The year 1949 was the 168th year of the Rattanakosin Kingdom of Thailand. It was the fourth year in the reign of King Bhumibol Adulyadej (Rama IX), and is reckoned as year 2492 in the Buddhist Era.

Incumbents
King: Bhumibol Adulyadej 
Crown Prince: (vacant)
Prime Minister: Plaek Phibunsongkhram
Supreme Patriarch: Vajirananavongs

Events

January

February

March

April

May

June

July

August

September

October

November

December

Births
26 July- Thaksin Shinawatra, Former Thai Prime Minister

Deaths

See also
 List of Thai films of 1949

References

External links

 
Years of the 20th century in Thailand
Thailand